Speaker may refer to:

Society and politics
 Speaker (politics), the presiding officer in a legislative assembly
 Public speaker, one who gives a speech or lecture
 A person producing speech: the producer of a given utterance, especially: 
 In poetry, the literary character uttering the lyrics of a poem or song, as opposed to the author writing the words of that character; see Character (arts)

Electronics
 Loudspeaker, a device that produces sound
 Computer speakers, speakers sold for use with computers
 Speaker driver, the essential electromechanical element of the loudspeaker

Arts, entertainment and media
 Los Speakers (or "The Speakers"), a Colombian rock band from the 1960s
 The Speaker (periodical), a weekly review published in London from 1890 to 1907
 The Speaker (TV series), a 2009 BBC television series
 "Speaker" (song), by David Banner
 "Speakers" (Sam Hunt song), 2014
 The Speaker, the second book in Traci Chee's Sea of Ink and Gold trilogy, published in 2017

Places
 Speaker Township, Michigan, US
 Speakers Bank, in the Indian Ocean
 Speakers' Corner (disambiguation)

Ships
 HMS Speaker (D90), a 1943 World War II Royal Navy aircraft carrier
 English ship Speaker (1650), frigate launched in 1650, renamed HMS Mary in 1660

People
 Tris Speaker (1888–1958), American baseball player
 Raymond Speaker (born 1935), Canadian farmer and politician

See also
 Professional speaker (disambiguation)
 Native Speaker (disambiguation)
 Spokesperson, someone engaged or elected to speak on behalf of others
 Grammatical person, grammatical category distinguishing the participants in a speech or signing event
 Voice actor, one who does voice recordings or spoken word performances